This is a list of notable individuals born in France of Lebanese ancestry or people of Lebanese and French dual nationality who live or lived in France.

Business

Businessmen and entrepreneurs
 Mouna Ayoub - businesswoman
 Frédéric Fekkai - French-American hairdresser and founder of Frédéric Fekkai salons and hair products
 Carlos Ghosn - CEO of Renault and Nissan
 Marwan Lahoud - CEO of the weapon branch of EADS
 Jacques Saadé - businessman
 Iskandar Safa - businessman

Fashion
 Reem Acra - fashion designer
 Omar Harfouch - fashion entrepreneur
 Elie Saab - fashion designer

Architecture
 Nabil Gholam - architect

Entertainment

Film, television and radio personalities
 Philippe Aractingi - film director
 Péri Cochin - television host
 Thomas Langmann - film producer and actor
 Jean-Pierre Rassam - film producer
 Julien Rassam - actor
 Léa Salamé - journalist

Musicians
 Rabih Abou-Khalil - jazz musician
 Bob Azzam - singer
 Guy Béart - singer and songwriter
 Louis Chedid - singer and songwriter
 Matthieu Chedid -  singer and songwriter, aka -M-
 Warda Al-Jazairia - singer
 Ibrahim Maalouf - trumpeter, composer, arranger 
 Pierre-Antoine Melki - also known as Nius, record producer (part of soFLY & Nius)
 Abdel Rahman El Bacha - pianist and composer
 Gabriel Yacoub - guitarist and singer
 Gabriel Yared - composer
 Ycare - singer-songwriter
 Grace Deeb - singer

Politicians
 Élie Aboud - member of the National Assembly of France
 Serge Ayoub - activist associated with the French extreme right
 Éric Besson - politician, minister
 Henri Jibrayel - politician
 Antoine Karam - former President of the Regional Council of French Guiana

Sports
 Ali Hallab - boxer
 Alexis Khazzaka - football player
 Larry Mehanna - football player

Writers
 Gilbert Achcar - academic, writer, socialist and anti-war activist
 Andrée Chedid - poet and novelist
 Georges Corm - historian and economist
 Randa Habib -  journalist
 Vénus Khoury-Ghata - writer
 Amin Maalouf - novelist
 Leilah Mahi - novelist
 Wajdi Mouawad - author and theater director
 Antoine Sfeir - journalist

See also
Lebanese people in France
France–Lebanon relations
List of Lebanese people
List of Lebanese people (Diaspora)

References

France
Lebanese
List
Lebanese